Jacques Neirynck (born 17 August 1931), Belgian-born and naturalized Swiss, is an emeritus professor at the École polytechnique fédérale de Lausanne (EPFL), writer and politician.

He is a member of the Christian Democratic People's Party of Switzerland. He was a member of the National Council between 1999 and 2003 as well as between 2007 and 2015.

Notes and references

See also 
 List of members of the National Council of Switzerland, 2007–11
 Presses polytechniques et universitaires romandes

External links 
 

1931 births
People from Uccle
Members of the National Council (Switzerland)
Politics of the canton of Vaud
Swiss writers in French
Catholic University of Leuven (1834–1968) alumni
Living people
Academic staff of the École Polytechnique Fédérale de Lausanne